Inside the Room is a 1935 British mystery film directed by Leslie S. Hiscott and starring Austin Trevor, Dorothy Boyd and George Hayes. It was shot at Twickenham Studios in west London. A French detective, Pierre Santos, investigates a popular singer suspected of murder. The film's sets were designed by the studio's resident art director James A. Carter.

Cast

References

1935 films
1930s English-language films
Films set in England
1935 mystery films
British mystery films
Films directed by Leslie S. Hiscott
Films shot at Twickenham Film Studios
Quota quickies
British black-and-white films
1930s British films